Corneille's Chapel, formally known as Corneille's Chapel, Auditorium of Normandy, is an auditorium, formerly Saint-Louis Church, located in the northeast of the city centre of Rouen, Normandy.

Specifications
The building can contain an audience of up to 700 people (depending on the configuration of the event). It welcomes live performances of chamber music as well as contemporary music. The French chamber choir Accentus, in residence at and partly fostered by the Rouen Opera House, often performs at this venue when in Rouen. Also, the hall benefits of the latest sound technologies, such as its unique and state-of-the-art 6.5m wide sound-reflecting sphere, built to enhance the audience experience. The auditorium is housed in the 17th century Chapel of the Lycée Corneille, a building listed as Monument Historique. The venue is run together by the Rouen Opera House and Normandy's Governing Bodies.

See also
 Saint-Louis Church, Rouen

References

Auditoriums
Music venues in France
Roman Catholic churches in Rouen